The 1986 Montana Grizzlies football team represented the University of Montana in the 1986 NCAA Division I-AA football season as a member of the Big Sky Conference (Big Sky). The Grizzlies were led by first-year head coach Don Read, played their home games at Dornblaser Field and Washington–Grizzly Stadium, and finished the season with a record of six wins and four losses (6–4, 4–4 Big Sky).

Schedule

Source:

References

External links
Montana Grizzlies football – 1986 media guide

Montana
Montana Grizzlies football seasons
Montana Grizzlies football